The Programmes and stakeholders relations Directorate or PSR, located in Brussels, Belgium and Ispra, Italy, is part of the Joint Research Centre (European Commission), a Directorate-General of the European Commission (EC).

The Programmes and stakeholders relations Directorate supports the JRC in the development and implementation of its relationships that will ensure the long-term success in the fulfilment of JRC mission and maximise its contribution to the objectives of the European Research Area (ERA).

PSR Units	
 Work Programme
 Intellectual property and scientific co-operation
 Customer and stakeholder relations
 Internal and external communications (Brussels/Ispra)
 Management support
 Work programme EURATOM
 Corporate Development

Joint Research Centre Institutes
 Institute for Transuranium Elements (ITU)
 Institute for the Protection and the Security of the Citizen (IPSC)
 Institute for Environment and Sustainability (IES)
 Institute for Health and Consumer Protection (IHCP)
 Institute for Energy (IE)
 Institute for Prospective Technological Studies (IPTS)

See also
 Directorate-General for Research (European Commission)

External links
 Institutional and Scientific Relations (ISR)

European Commission
Research